Christopher John Mayfield (born 18 December 1935) is a retired Anglican bishop of the Church of England.

Mayfield was born in Plymouth but grew up in Worcester and was educated at Sedbergh School and Gonville and Caius College, Cambridge, where he read Mechanical Sciences. After four years teaching engineering in the Royal Air Force he was ordained in 1964 and became a curate at St Martin's in the Bull Ring, Birmingham. He was then a lecturer at the same church before becoming the Vicar of Luton.

He was appointed the Rural Dean of Luton in 1974 and then the Archdeacon of Bedford (1979–1985) before his appointment to the episcopate as the Bishop of Wolverhampton in 1985. He was consecrated as a bishop on 30 November 1985, by Robert Runcie, Archbishop of Canterbury, at St Paul's Cathedral. He was translated in 1993 to be Bishop of Manchester and retired in 2002. He currently ministers as an honorary assistant bishop in the Diocese of Worcester.

References

1935 births
Clergy from Worcester, England
People educated at Sedbergh School
Alumni of Gonville and Caius College, Cambridge
Archdeacons of Bedford
20th-century Church of England bishops
21st-century Church of England bishops
Bishops of Wolverhampton
Bishops of Manchester
Living people